Kagemori may refer to:

 (died 1248), Japanese warrior monk
, train station in Chichibu, Saitama Prefecture, Japan

Japanese masculine given names